A Fish in the Bathtub is a 1999 comedy film directed by Joan Micklin Silver. It stars real life couple Jerry Stiller and Anne Meara.

Plot
Jerry Stiller and Anne Meara play Sam and Molly, a married husband and wife whose marriage has been stretched to the brink after 40 years of incessant bickering over the smallest of things, not the least of which is Sam's inexplicable decision to keep a fish in the bathtub. This, along with a daily harangue from the cantankerous Sam, forces Molly to finally pack a bag and go to son Joel's home, which sets the stage for the family to fight through this bump in the road and get life back on track.

Cast
 Jerry Stiller as Sam
 Anne Meara as Molly
 Mark Ruffalo as Joel
 Jane Adams as Ruthie
 Doris Roberts as Freida
 Louis Zorich as Morris
 Phyllis Newman as Sylvia Rosen
 Val Avery as Abe
 Bob Dishy as Lou Moskowitz
 Mordecai Lawner as Bernie
 Peter McRobbie as Father Malaccky
 Jonathan Hogan as Eldon Krantz
 Elizabeth Franz as Bea Greenberg

Reception
The film has been generally poorly received. Contact Music referred to it as "Just not that humorous". The New York Times criticized the film's dialogue, stating that "...the bickering goes too far..." Killer Movies referred to its plot as "...nothing particularly new or significant or eye-popping..."

References

External links
 

1999 films
1999 comedy films
American comedy films
Films shot in New York City
Films directed by Joan Micklin Silver
American independent films
1999 independent films
1990s English-language films
1990s American films